The Kuban War or Crimean-Circassian War of 1571 was a military conflict between the Crimean Khanate and the Kabardian Principality.

History 
Kabardian prince Temroqwa believed that the only way for Kabardian independence was to ally with Russia. Ivan the Terrible supported Temroqwa's goal to extend his power inside Circassia and to unify the lands of Circassians under his reign. Temroqwa established a fort in Mozdok that enabled the Circassian and Russian forces to perform joint training. Ossetian and Ingushetian lands, as well as the Turkic people, became subjects of the Kabardian raising power. Temroqwa's expansion extended towards the Georgian kingdoms in the south.

In 1570, the Tatars swept and burned Moscow. During their retreat, as revenge for having relations with Russia, Tatar forces marched towards northwestern Circassia in 1571.

Temroqwa, against the advice of his counsellors, launched a counterattack. A battle took place on the banks of the Kuban where Temroqwa was killed and two of his sons, Mashoqwa and Bulat-Djery, were captured.

References 

16th-century conflicts
Wars involving the Circassians
Military operations involving the Crimean Khanate
16th century in the Crimean Khanate